Touws River may refer to:
 Touws River (river), a river in the Western Cape, South Africa
 Touws River (town), a town situated on the banks of the river